Clarence B. "Chip" Vaughn (born October 26, 1985) is a former American football safety who is currently a full-time defensive assistant with the New York Jets. He was drafted by the New Orleans Saints in the fourth round of the 2009 NFL Draft. He played college football at Wake Forest.

Vaughn has also been a member of the Philadelphia Eagles and Indianapolis Colts.

Early years
Vaughn played high school football at Rampart high school in Colorado Springs, CO for a year then moved to Robinson Secondary School in Fairfax, Virginia.

Professional career

New Orleans Saints
On April 26, 2009, Vaughn was drafted by the New Orleans Saints in the 4th round (116th overall) of the 2009 NFL Draft. He was placed on injured reserve and missed the entire 2009 season. He was waived on September 4, 2010.

Philadelphia Eagles
Vaughn was signed to the Philadelphia Eagles' practice squad on September 6, 2010. He was released on September 21.

Indianapolis Colts
Vaughn was signed by the Indianapolis Colts on October 25, 2010. He was waived on November 13, but re-signed on November 16. He was placed on injured reserve on November 23.  Vaughn was called for two personal fouls in the last two minutes of a preseason game between the Indianapolis Colts and the Green Bay Packers on August 26, 2011. He was waived on August 28.

Coaching career
Vaughn was named the secondary coach at the Air Force Academy in 2018. He left after the 2019 season to join the coaching staff of the New York Jets as a defensive assistant.

References

External links
Air Force profile
Fayetteville State profile
Philadelphia Eagles bio
Wake Forest Demon Deacons bio
seattlepi.com

1985 births
Living people
People from Goldsboro, North Carolina
Players of American football from North Carolina
American football safeties
Wake Forest Demon Deacons football players
New Orleans Saints players
Philadelphia Eagles players
Indianapolis Colts players
Saskatchewan Roughriders players
Robinson Secondary School alumni
High school football coaches in Texas
Air Force Falcons football coaches
New York Jets coaches